Blackpink Arena Tour 2018 was the first concert tour by South Korean girl group Blackpink. The tour was held in Japan, from July 24 to December 24, 2018, to promote their first Japanese extended play Blackpink.

Background 
Six shows were initially scheduled. An extra show was later in Chiba added due to overwhelming demand. On July 7, the final stop of the tour was added for December 24 at Kyocera Dome Osaka. They embarked on their first concert tour of Japan titled "Black Pink Arena Tour 2018" in Osaka on July 24 and July 25.

Set list 
 "Ddu-Du-Ddu-Du"
 "Forever Young"
 "Whistle" (acoustic version)
 "Stay" (Japanese version)
 "Can''t Take My Eyes Off You" (Frankie Valli cover) (Jennie solo)
 "Solo" (Jennie solo) (during Special final in Kyocera Dome Osaka only)
 "Eyes Closed" / "Eyes, Nose, Lips" (Rosé solo)
 "Lemon" / "Faded" / "Attention" (Lisa solo dance number)
 "Sakurairo Mau Koro" (Jisoo solo)
 "Yuki no Hana" (Jisoo solo) (during Special final in Kyocera Dome Osaka only)
 "Yoncé" (Beyoncé cover, dance number)
 "So Hot" (The Black Label remix) (Wonder Girls cover)
 "See U Later"
 "Really"
 "Boombayah" (Japanese version)
 "Playing With Fire" (Japanese version)
 "As If It's Your Last" (Japanese version)

Encore

 "Whistle" (Japanese version)
 "Ddu-Du-Ddu-Du"

Tour dates

Live album

Blackpink Arena Tour 2018 "Special Final in Kyocera Dome Osaka" is the first live album of the South Korean music group Blackpink, released on March 22, 2019.

Background 
The Blackpink Arena Tour group's first Japanese concert began in July 2018, visited three cities in Japan and hosted a total of eight concerts, bringing together a total of 125,000 spectators. This video album contains live videos of the final show at the Osaka Dome on December 24, 2018, with the participation of 50,000 fans. The album includes live performances and recordings of "Boombayah", "Whistle", "Stay", "Playing with Fire", "As If It's Your Last" and "Ddu-Du Ddu-Du".

The album's release was originally scheduled for March 13, 2019, but was postponed to March 22.

Track listing 
 "Ddu-Du Ddu-Du" (Japanese version)
 "Forever Young" (Japanese version)
 "Whistle" (acoustic; Japanese version)
 "Stay" (Japanese version)
 "Let It Be / You & I / Only Look at Me" (Rosé's Solo Stage)
 "Yukino Hana" (Jisoo's Solo Stage)
 "Solo" (Jennie's Solo Stage)
 "Last Christmas / Rudolph the Red-Nosed Reindeer"
 "Kiss and Make Up" (Blackpink only version)
 "So Hot" (The Black Label Remix)
 "Really" (Japanese version)
 "See U Later" (Japanese version)
 "Boombayah" (Japanese version)
 "Playing with Fire" (Japanese version)
 "As If It's Your Last" (Japanese version)

Personnel
Blackpink
 Jisoo
 Jennie
 Rosé
 Lisa

Band
 Omar Dominick (Bass)
 Dante Jackson (Keyboard)
 Justin Lyons (Guitar)
 Bennie Rodgers II (Drums)

References

Blackpink concert tours
2018 concert tours
Concert tours of Asia
Concert tours of Japan